Michelle Rodríguez is a Mexican actress, singer and comedian who performs in films, theatre and television. She is known for playing the character of Toña in the television series 40 y 20.

Biography 
Born in Xochimilco, she wanted to become an actress and comedian from a young age, however opted to study visual communication and design at National Autonomous University of Mexico (UNAM).

She has been active in the entertainment industry since 1999, beginning with studying dubbing, voiceover and radio production, before training in comedy, musical theatre, improv theatre and acting.

Her television debut came in 2012 with the successful telenovela Amores verdaderos, where she played as the friendly character of "Polita", co-starring with actors such as Erika Buenfil, Eduardo Yáñez, Sebastián Rulli and Eiza González, and also provided distinctive voice acting to the show.

In 2016 she joined the main cast of the comedy series 40 y 20 where she plays Toña, sharing scenes with Jorge van Rankin and Mauricio Garza.

Filmography

Television

Film

Awards and nominations

Premios Ariel

References 

Mexican comedians
Actresses from Mexico City
Mexican women singers
Mexican stage actresses
Mexican television actresses
Mexican film actresses
Mexican television actors
Year of birth missing (living people)
Living people